Komura or Kōmura is a Japanese surname. Notable people with the surname include:

Ayumi Komura, Japanese manga artist
Keizō Komura (1896–1978), Vice Admiral in the Imperial Japanese Navy during World War II
Komura Jutarō, GCB, GCMG, GCVO (1855–1911), statesman and diplomat in Meiji period Japan
Masahiko Kōmura (born 1942), Japanese politician of the Liberal Democratic Party

See also
Kōmura's theorem, result on the differentiability of absolutely continuous Banach space-valued functions

Japanese-language surnames

de:Kōmura